Gaunshahar is a town and market place at Besishahar Municipality in Lamjung District in Gandaki Province of northern-central Nepal. The Besishahar Municipality was formed by merging the existing Village Development Committees i.e. Besishahar, Gaunshahar, Udipur & Chandisthan on May 15, 2014. The temple of Lamjung Kalika & Lamjung Durbar are located here. This place is in the way of Annapurna Conservation Area. The Dumre-Besishahar-Chame highway also goes from this place. Here are different casts and religions.

Population
At the time of the 2011 Nepal census it had a population of 6,611 (3,752 Female & 2,859 Male) people living in 1,757 individual Households.

Media 
Gaunshahar has one FM Radio station Radio Lamjung 88.4 MHz. Radio Chautari 91.4 MHz. This is a Community Radio station. Kaule Pani Home stay is also promoting the local culture in Gaunshahar.

See also
 Besishahar Municipality
 Udipur
 Chandisthan
 Lamjung District

References

Lamjung District
Populated places in Lamjung District